Hassan Kazemi Qomi is the currently ambassador of Iran to Afghanistan and special representative of Iran to Afghanistan under the Taliban regime. 

He was formerly the ambassador of Iran to Iraq.In 2007, U.S. general in Iraq David Petraeus claimed that Kazemi Qomi is a member of the Quds Force.

On October 17, 2021, President Ebrahim Raisi appointed Kazemi Qomi as the special envoy to Afghanistan.

See also
Karbala provincial headquarters raid

References

Living people
People from Qom
Iranian diplomats
Ambassadors of Iran to Iraq
Afghanistan–Iran relations
1959 births